Aimée von Pereira (born 16 February 2000) is a German handball player who plays for OGC Nice Handball.

In September 2018, she was included by EHF in a list of the twenty best young handballers to watch for the future.

Achievements
 German Vice Champion, wjA 2018
 European U-17 Handball Championship:
 Gold Medalist: 2017
 German Champion, wjA 2017
 Schleswig-Holstein Schools, Federal State Champion 2009

Individual awards  
 Most Valuable Player of the European U-17 Handball Championship: 2017

References
 

2000 births
Living people
Sportspeople from Hamburg
German female handball players